Cytharomorula benedicta is a species of sea snail, a marine gastropod mollusk, in the family Muricidae, the murex snails or rock snails.

Distribution
This marine species occurs off the Loyalty Islands.

References

 Houart R. (2013) Revised classification of a group of small species of Cytharomorula Kuroda, 1953 (Muricidae: Ergalataxinae) from the Indo-West Pacific. Novapex 14(2): 25-34

benedicta
Gastropods described in 1895